Craignish (Scottish Gaelic, Creiginis) is a peninsula in Argyll, on the west coast of Scotland. To the south is Loch Craignish, which contains several small islands. To the north are the Slate Islands, with the island of Shuna closest.

There are two main settlements on Craignish, Ardfern on the south coast, and the modern village of Craobh Haven, established in 1983 as a holiday resort and marina, on the north. A single-track road, the B8002, runs along the south shore of the peninsula.

Historic monuments
There are a number of ruined duns on Craignish, as well as cup and ring marked rocks. One such site is Dunan Aula, a cist said to commemorate a Viking prince so-named, who fell in battle against the native Scots. At Kirkton, the remains of the early 13th-century chapel of Kilmarie still stand. A chapel on this site is said to have been founded by St Máel Ruba, from whom the modern name is derived. The chapel was repaired in the 19th century, and again in 1926, and now houses a collection of 14th- and 15th-century sculptured grave slabs.

Near the chapel is Craignish Castle, originally home of the Campbells of Craignish. A castle was established here in the early 12th century, although the extant tower house dates from the late 14th century at the earliest. The castle withstood a siege by Alasdair "Colkitto" MacDonald in the 1640s. A new wing was added between 1698 and 1710, and offices and stables were added around 1770. In 1800 the estate was sold to Campbell of Jura, and in 1837 a new mansion was built on the side of the tower house, replacing the earlier extensions. Design of the new mansion has been attributed to either William Burn or Joseph Gordon Davis. In 1850 the estate was sold again to the Gascoignes of Parlington Hall, Yorkshire, who made yet more changes. Half of the 1837 mansion has since been demolished, and a stair tower added on the new gable.

Close to Craobh Haven is Lunga, a 16th-century tower house originally known as Daill. This too was built by the Campbells of Craignish, before it was sold to the MacDougalls in around 1785. It has been in the MacDougall of Lunga family ever since, and is now partially run as bed and breakfast accommodation. A memorial to two of the MacDougalls of Lunga, father and son, who died in the First World War, stands at the edge of Craobh Haven.

The early 19th century paddle steamer PS Comet sank off Craignish Point on December 13, 1820.

In literature

Naomi Mitchison wrote of a visit to Craignish with her family: "We are up here in an incredibly beautiful place thirty place from a station, all very Celtic, islands and sunsets and sea lochs of blue paint. The gentry are rather alarming - those narrow cruel Highland faces, mouths and eyes a little twisted and arrogant and something too delicate and inbred about their hands and skin. But the farmers are capital red heads and very jolly to talk to, rather less dour than my own coast". 
.

References

A Visitor's Guide to Craignish, n.d.
Coventry, Martin The Castles of Scotland; 3rd ed., Goblinshead, 2001
Walker, Frank Arneil The Buildings of Scotland: Argyll and Bute, Penguin, 2000

External links

The Craignish Community Website
Details of Craignish Castle from the nineteenth century, on the Parlington Hall web site.
 The Craignish Boat Club web site
 Ardfern the largest village

Landforms of Argyll and Bute
Peninsulas of Scotland